Ushakovo is a rural locality (a selo) in Korochansky District, Belgorod Oblast, Russia. The population was 46 as of 2010. There is 1 street.

Geography 
Ushakovo is located 31 km southwest of Korocha (the district's administrative centre) by road. Novotroyevka is the nearest rural locality.

References 

Rural localities in Korochansky District